Vice-Admiral Thomas Erskine Wardle,  (9 January 1877 – 9 May 1944) was a senior officer in the Royal Navy. He was the Rear-Admiral Commanding His Majesty's Australian Fleet from 30 April 1924 to 30 April 1926.

Early life
Wardle was born on 9 January 1877 in the village of Winshill near Burton-on-Trent. the son of Henry Wardle then a Member of Parliament for Burton on Trent.

Naval career
Wardle joined the Royal Navy on 15 July 1890 when he entered the training ship HMS Britannia, and during his career served at every Royal Navy station. He was appointed midshipman on 15 July 1892 and sub-lieutenant on 15 January 1896 before being promoted to Lieutenant on 15 January 1897. He was awarded the Japanese Order of the Rising Sun for services in the Far East. He was promoted to commander on 31 December 1907. During the First World War he served with the 10th Cruiser Squadron under Vice Admiral Sir Dudley de Chair.

Promoted to captain in June 1915 and later given command of the armed merchantman HMS Alcantara, he was in command during the action with the German raider SMS Greif in the North Sea. On 29 February 1916, Alcantara with HMS Andes, came upon the Greif, which appeared to be an unarmed merchant vessel. While a boarding party was leaving the Alcantara to board Greif the German vessel dropped her bulwarks and opened fire on the Alcantara. In the ensuing encounter which followed, Alcantara and Greif  were sunk. He spent 20 minutes in the water before being rescued. For his gallantry in this fight he was awarded the Distinguished Service Order. He later was in command of HMS Danae and after the end of the First World War he served as chief of the British mission in Greece and later as part of the Reserve Fleet at the Nore, in command of HMS Calliope.

He became Rear-Admiral Commanding His Majesty's Australian Fleet from 30 April 1924 until 30 April 1926. He was appointed Companion of the Order of the Bath on 5 June 1926. He retired at his own request on 9 July 1926, and was advanced to vice admiral.

Family life
Wardle married Gwendolyne Gladys Marguerite Baird in 1902 in Glasgow, they had two children. They were divorced in 1910 Wardle died on 9 May 1944 at Coniston, Caledon Road, Beaconsfield.

Notes

References
The Argus (Melbourne, Vic) – Tuesday 22 April 1924. p10.
The Argus (Melbourne, Vic) – Friday 4 January 1924. p7.

1877 births
1944 deaths
Military personnel from Staffordshire
Companions of the Distinguished Service Order
Companions of the Order of the Bath
People from Burton upon Trent
Recipients of the Order of the Rising Sun
Royal Navy admirals
Royal Navy officers of World War I